Tyler Jaden Napier Edward Onyango (born 4 March 2003) is an English professional footballer who plays as a central midfielder for Forest Green Rovers on loan from Everton.

Career
On 24 January 2021, Onyango made his first-team debut for Everton when he came off of the bench to replace André Gomes in the 85th minute of an FA Cup fourth round victory over Sheffield Wednesday. On 21 November 2021, Onyango made his Premier League debut as a substitute in the final minute of a 3–0 defeat to Manchester City, going on to make a further two league appearances in the 2021–22 season as Everton narrowly avoided relegation.

On 27 July 2022, Onyango joined EFL League One club Burton Albion on a season-long loan deal. In January 2023, Onyango returned to Everton.

On 27 January 2023, Onyango returned to League One to join bottom club Forest Green Rovers on loan until the end of the season, the first signing for new manager, and former Everton youth coach, Duncan Ferguson.

International career
Onyango was born in England to a Kenyan father and English mother. He is a youth international for England at under-17 level.

Career statistics

Club

Notes

References

2003 births
Living people
Footballers from Luton
English footballers
England youth international footballers
English people of Kenyan descent
Association football midfielders
Everton F.C. players
Burton Albion F.C. players
Forest Green Rovers F.C. players
Premier League players
English Football League players
Black British sportspeople